Clarence is a small town in Canterbury, in the South Island of New Zealand. It was named after King William IV of the United Kingdom, who prior to his accession was Duke of Clarence.

Surfing 
Clarence has several surf breaks near the river mouth. Due to their difficulty, they are recommended for advanced to expert surfers.

River rafting 
River rafting trips on the Waiau Toa / Clarence River have been run commercially since 1998.

2016 Kaikōura earthquake 
Clarence and the surrounding area was significantly affected by the M7.8 2016 Kaikōura earthquake and cut off for some months from the rest of the South Island. The area was briefly evacuated following a slip upstream on the Waiau Toa / Clarence which caused a build up of water, threatening flash flooding in the town.

References

Kaikōura District
Populated places in Canterbury, New Zealand